Satoru Yamamoto (July 14, 1925 – December 17, 2006) was Grand Chamberlain of Japan (1988–1996). He graduated from the University of Tokyo.

References

1925 births
2006 deaths
University of Tokyo alumni